Oxazepines are a family of unsaturated heterocycles containing seven atoms, with a nitrogen replacing a carbon at one position and with an oxygen replacing a carbon at one position.

See also
 Azepine
 Benzazepines
 Diazepine
 Oxepin
 Borepin
 CR gas (dibenzoxazepine)

References